An area of special scientific interest or ASSI is a conservation designation denoting a protected area in Northern Ireland. ASSIs are the equivalent of sites of special scientific interest (SSSIs) in the rest of the United Kingdom.

They are the basic building block of site-based nature conservation legislation and most other legal nature/geological conservation designations in Northern Ireland are based upon them, including national nature reserves, Ramsar sites, Special Protection Areas, and Special Areas of Conservation.

See also
 Conservation in the United Kingdom
 List of SSSIs by Area of Search
 List of ASSIs in Northern Ireland
 Joint Nature Conservation Committee

References

External links
Environment & Heritage Service Northern Ireland clickable map plus notes of Areas of Special Scientific Interest in Northern Ireland

Conservation in the United Kingdom
Protected areas of Northern Ireland
 
Town and country planning in the United Kingdom